Donald Richards can refer to:

 Donald Richards (cricketer) (born 1942), Antiguan cricketer
 Donald Richards (singer) (1919–1953), American singer
 Donald Richards (statistician) (born 1955), Jamaican statistician